Robert Garfield Vail (September 24, 1881 – March 22, 1942), nicknamed "Doc", was a Major League Baseball pitcher who briefly played with the Pittsburgh Pirates during the  season. He batted and threw right-handed.

He was born in Linneus, Maine and died in Philadelphia, Pennsylvania.

External links

1881 births
1942 deaths
Major League Baseball pitchers
Baseball players from Maine
Colby Mules baseball players
Davidson Wildcats baseball players
Pittsburgh Pirates players
People from Linneus, Maine
Nashua (minor league baseball) players
Lynn Shoemakers players
Portsmouth Truckers players
Richmond Colts players
Roanoke Tigers players
Petersburg Goobers players
Norfolk Tars players